Vaudhey Mee is Maldivian romantic drama television series co-written and directed by Abdul Faththaah. It stars Aishath Rishmy, Mohamed Manik,  Aminath Ameela, Ahmed Nimal, Ahmed Saeed and Zeenath Abbas in main roles. The pilot episode of the series was released on 3 August 2013.

Film production began in late 2012. The first eight episodes of the series was written by director Abdul Faththaah, who later roped in screenwriter Mahdi Ahmed to complete the remaining five episodes.

Cast and characters

Main
 Aishath Rishmy as Aishath Hana
 Aminath Ameela as Hudha
 Mohamed Manik as Fizam
 Ahmed Nimal as Shakir; Hana and Hudha's father
 Zeenath Abbas as Shaaira
 Ahmed Saeed as Qasim

Recurring
 Mariyam Haleem
 Mohamed Rasheed
 Mariyam Shahuza
 Mohamed Waheed as taxi driver

Episodes

Soundtrack

Release and reception
The first episode of the series was aired through Television Maldives on 3 August 2013, on the occasion of Ramadan 1434. Upon release, the series mainly received porisitive response for the direction and performance of the cast.

References

External links 
 

Serial drama television series
Maldivian television shows